The Higher National Engineering School of Tunis, is a public institution of higher education and scientific research and a member of the University of Tunis.

ENSIT establishment was a response to the increasing industrialization of Tunisia. The school is currently an "école d'ingénieurs", or school of engineering, which follows to some extent the European polytechnic university model. In 2011, the main focus of ENSIT was to form engineers with high scientific aptitude in the fields of civil, mechanical, electrical engineering and computer science. The academic year of 2012/2013 brought two more specializations: industrial engineering and applied mathematics. The change of curriculum has dictated an end to the LMD reforms (License, Master, Doctorate) by which the admission process was organized. However, the school retains its doctorate and master's programs.

History
The ENSET was regarded as a normal school with credit and prestige. In 2011, the ENSIT was established as an engineering school with both undergraduate and graduate programs.

Admission 
Undergraduate candidates will have to sit for the national competitive exams for engineering studies. Individual applications to the graduate and post-graduate programs are accepted but require a high academic profile.

References 

Educational institutions established in 1973
Engineering universities and colleges
Tunis University
1973 establishments in Tunisia